Sepia tanybracheia is a species of cuttlefish native to the southeastern Indian Ocean. It is known only from the type locality. S. tanybracheia lives at depths of 200 to 205 m.

Males grow to a mantle length of 51 mm.

The type specimen was collected off Western Australia and is deposited at the Museum of Victoria in Melbourne.

References

External links

Cuttlefish
Molluscs described in 2000
Taxa named by Amanda Reid (malacologist)